Kushchuba is a rural locality (a station) in Staroselskoye Rural Settlement, Vologodsky District, Vologda Oblast, Russia. The population was 27 as of 2002.

Geography 
Kushchuba is located 62 km west of Vologda (the district's administrative centre) by road. Borodkino is the nearest rural locality.

References 

Rural localities in Vologodsky District